Brickellia wendtii is a North American species of flowering plants in the family Asteraceae. It is native to northern Mexico in the state of Coahuila.

Brickellia wendtii is a subshrub up to 100 cm (39 inches) tall. It has numerous small flower heads with cream-colored or pale green flowers.

The species is named for US botanist Thomas Leighton Wendt (1950-).

References

wendtii
Flora of Coahuila
Plants described in 1990